Planet Voyage is an album by the German andean new age band Cusco. It was released originally in 1982, and is currently available under the Prudence label.

This album contains three of the tracks which were later reworked for the Mystic Island release (Milky Way, Pisces, and Leo), and also contains the track Venus, which utilizes what would become a signature synthesized panflute sound, and also electric rock guitars, and which has been featured on multiple compilations of Cusco's early material. Some of the more relatively reliable Cusco discographies show a 1983 release date, but the early Arista and Yupiteru pressings verify the 1982 original release year.

Track listing
"Milky Way" 
"Ursa minor"
"Pisces"
"Swan"
"Andromeda"
"Venus"
"Leo"
"Saturn"
"Mars"
"Pegasus"

Album credits
Kristian Schultz – Arranger, keyboard 
Heidi Zimmermann – Choir, chorus  
Michael Holm  – Arranger, choir, chorus, producer  
Guenter-Erik  – Thoener Mellotron  
Rainer Pietsch  – Choir, Chorus  
Todd Canedy – Drums, percussion  
Jochen Scheffter – Engineer  
Charly Hörnemann – Guitar  
Cusco – Main Performer  
Gary Unwin – Bass guitar  
Andy Marx – Guitar

1982 albums
Cusco (band) albums